A promegakaryocyte is a precursor cell for a megakaryocyte. It arises from a megakaryoblast, into a promegakaryocyte and then into a megakaryocyte, which will eventually break off and become a platelet.

The developmental stages of the megakaryocyte are:
CFU-Me (pluripotential hemopoietic stem cell or hemocytoblast) → megakaryoblast → promegakaryocyte → megakaryocyte.

When the megakaryoblast matures into the promegakaryocyte, it undergoes endoreduplication and forms a promegakaryocyte which has multiple nuclei, azurophilic granules, and a basophilic cytoplasm. The promegakaryocyte has rotary motion, but no forward migration.

Promegakaryocytes and other precursor cells to megakaryocytes arise from pluripotential hematopoietic progenitors. The megakaryoblast is then produced, followed by the promegakaryocyte, the granular megakaryocyte, and then the mature megakaryocyte. When it is in its promegakaryocyte stage, it is considered an undifferentiated cell. 

Megakaryocyte pieces will eventually break off and begin circulating the body as platelets. Platelets are very important because of their role in blood clotting, immune response, and the formation of new blood vessels.

References

External links 
 "Marrow aspirate, 10x.  Promegakaryocyte" at ttuhsc.edu
 "Megakaryocytes: Promegakaryocyte" at bloodline.net

Immune system
Blood cells